Bedřich Vygoda (born 29 May 1894, date of death unknown) was a Czech sprinter. He competed for Bohemia in the men's 100 metres at the 1912 Summer Olympics.

References

External links
 
 

1894 births
Year of death missing
Athletes (track and field) at the 1912 Summer Olympics
Czech male sprinters
Olympic athletes of Bohemia
Athletes from Prague